Korepino is a rural locality (a village) in Argunovskoye Rural Settlement, Nikolsky District, Vologda Oblast, Russia. The population was 7 as of 2002.

Geography 
Korepino is located 45 km northwest of Nikolsk (the district's administrative centre) by road. Pichug is the nearest rural locality.

References 

Rural localities in Nikolsky District, Vologda Oblast